Fritz Huber may refer to:
 Fritz Huber (wrestler) (born 1949), German Olympic wrestler
 Fritz Huber (engineer) (1881–1942), German mechanical engineer
 Fritz Huber (astronomer) (1958–2015), German amateur astronomer

See also 
 Asteroid 436048 Fritzhuber, named after the astronomer